Glipa stenaliodes is a species of beetle in the genus Glipa. It was described in 1931.

References

stenaliodes
Beetles described in 1931